Fissurisepta granulosa is a species of sea snail, a marine gastropod mollusk in the family Fissurellidae, the keyhole limpets. It is found in the northeast Atlantic Ocean and in the Mediterranean Sea.

Description
The Fissurisepta granulosa has a rounded shell. Its diameter usually ranges from 3 - 4.5 mm.

Distribution
This species of sea snail is found in the Mediterranean Sea and the northeast Atlantic Ocean, around Europe.

References

External links
  Serge GOFAS, Ángel A. LUQUE, Joan Daniel OLIVER,José TEMPLADO & Alberto SERRA (2021) - The Mollusca of Galicia Bank (NE Atlantic Ocean); European Journal of Taxonomy 785: 1–114

Fissurellidae
Gastropods described in 1883